is a Japanese tourism facility located next to Kumamoto Castle in Kumamoto City, Kumamoto Prefecture. The facility is composed of three areas: Josaien Kumamoto Castle Shops (a collection of 23 shops and restaurants offering food and products from Kumamoto), Kumamoto Castle Museum Wakuwakuza (a facility with exhibits on the history and culture of Kumamoto), and a tourism information office.

General information
Admission: Free, except for Wakuwakuza
Hours
Kumamoto Castle Museum Wakuwakuza/Tourism Information Office
March–November: 8:30-18:30, December–February: 8:00-17:30 (Last entrance to Wakuwakuza is 30 minutes before closing)
Open until 19:30 when Kumamoto Castle is open at night.
Josaien Kumamoto Castle Shops
Shops March–November: 9:00-19:00, December–February: 9:00-18:00
Dining 11:00-22:00 (last order and closing times differ for each restaurant)
Closed: 12/30-31
Parking
Regular vehicles (passenger vehicles, motorcycles): Pay parking available
Buses: Free parking (up to 3 hours, reservations made at least one day prior to visit required)

Location
1-1 Ninomaru, Chuo-ku, Kumamoto, Japan 860-0008

See also
Kumamoto Castle

References

External links
 Official Sakuranobaba Josaien website
 Official Josaien Kumamoto Castle Shops website

Buildings and structures in Kumamoto
Tourist attractions in Kumamoto Prefecture